Kilmurry-Negaul is a civil parish and a village in County Clare, Ireland.

Location

Kilmurry-Negaul is a civil parish containing a village with the name Kilmurry.
It was within the barony of Tulla Upper, but as of 1845 had recently been transferred to the barony of Bunratty Lower.
There is a large tract of fine arable country of a light limestone where the parishes of Quinn, Clonlea and Kilmurry-Negral meet.

Antiquity

The name Kilmurry means "Church of the Virgin Mary", but originally the parish may have been dedicated to an Irish saint.
A holy well near the old church is dedicated to Saint Tobar Faoile.
The castle of Rossroe, well-preserved in 1897, belonged to Fineen, son of Loghlen MacNamara, in 1580.
The castle of Drumullan was in 1580 the property of Covea, son of Mahone MacNamara.
The parish lay in MacNamara territory, and the families of this powerful sect would not abandon the Catholic faith.

During the reign of King William III of England (1689–1702) John Lawson, an Englishman, was given the rectories of Quin, Tulloo, Cluony, Dowry, Templemaley, Kilraghtis and Kilmurry-Negaul.
Opposite the record of this appointment was the note, "No cure served at present; noe church in repaire; the country all wast."
These had been seven of the best parishes in the county.

On 18 March 1790 the vicarages of Kilseily, Bunratty, Clonlea, Clonloghan, Finogh, Kilconry, Killuran, Kilfinaghty, Kilmurrynegaul, Kilnoe and Tomfinlough were episcopally united in the Church of Ireland.
In 1810 the Church of Ireland rectory of Kilmurraynegaul was valued in the King's books at £0.6.8 sterling.
It was one of the parishes that made up the Union of Kilseily.
As of 1837 the civil parish was part of the Catholic union of Sixmilebridge.

The population was 980 in 1821 and had fallen to 628 in 1831.
In 1841 the population had risen to 699 in 101 houses.
The old burial ground in the village had the ruins of an old church in 1837.
By 1897 all traces of the church had gone, but the graveyard surrounding it remained in use.

Townlands

The townlands are Cloonmunnia,  Cragroe,  Drumullan,  Kilcornan, Kilkishen,  Kilkishen Demesne,  Kilmurry,  Knocknalappa,  Rosroe,  Shandangan East and Shandangan West.

References
Notes

Citations

Sources

 

Civil parishes of County Clare
Towns and villages in County Clare